The Kenmare Incident, as it came to be known, was an attack in 1923 by senior Irish Army officers on two young women in their own home in Kenmare, County Kerry, Ireland. Two investigations were undertaken, one by the Garda Síochána and one by a Dublin Military Court of Inquiry. Both recommended court proceedings. After the intervention of the Minister for Defence, Richard Mulcahy and the President of the Executive Council (prime minister) W. T. Cosgrave, neither was acted upon.

Initial events

The Judge Advocate General Cahir Davitt was called in June 1923 to see a very irritated Adjutant General Gearóid O'Sullivan. He was handed a file, with O'Sullivan saying, "This is the worst yet." It contained details of an attack by Dublin Guard officers on young women.

In the file, it was alleged that three Dublin Guard officers went to the home of Dr. Randall McCarthy in Kenmare, Cunty Kerry. They pulled his two daughters from their beds into the garden, used their Sam Browne belts to beat them and doused their hair with dirty motor oil or cart grease. The act was, apparently, a reprisal.

Civic guards investigated and found the officers to be from Kerry Command, based at Ballymullen Barracks, Tralee. One of the accused officers was the GOC of Kerry Command, Paddy O'Daly (also known as Paddy Daly), a former member of Michael Collins's Squad. A revolver found in the garden was declared as his. O'Daly later blamed the victims and said they had consorted with British Army officers before the Truce, which was by then two years gone, and that one had 'jilted' an Irish Army officer.

When asked his opinion on the file, Davitt said it called for disciplinary action. O'Sullivan baulked at that by saying that he did not believe the report and citedcited O'Daly's war record. In discussion, Davitt said if they did not act then the Guards might prosecute, Mr.McCarthy's daughters might sue, and if it was made public that the officers were not disciplined, it could be a catastrophe for the army. In any case, they were duty-bound: the execution of the Civil War itself was predicated on such a principle. O'Sullivan could not square the investigation's details with his personal view of O'Daly and raised the possibility of the Guards' bias, given recent tension between the departments of Justice and Defence. Davitt proposed a Military Court of Inquiry provided the result was acted upon if it supported the Guards' findings.

Military court
An inquiry, presided over by John Hearne, was instigated. A prima facie case against the three was established. O'Sullivan agreed that a General Court-Martial was now required and proceeded, with Davitt, to select carefully seven officers for the task who were believed to be unbiased either way.

Commander-in-Chief and Minister for Defence Richard Mulcahy asked Davitt if the case was clear cut, which Davitt confirmed. Mulcahy mirrored the initial stated opinion of O'Sullivan by referring to O'Daly's army and national record. Davitt repeated the arguments he used with O'Sullivan. Mulcahy said that O'Daly had avowed his innocence to him personally and that he was minded to take his word and drop the case. Davitt asked if the simple acceptance of someone's word should then apply to all accused officers and what of the other two suspects? Mulcahy bemoaned his predicament. He followed Davitt's suggestion of asking Attorney-General Hugh Kennedy's advice.

Executive Council reaction
To Davitt's amazement, Kennedy said that the evidence was not strong enough. Dismissing the women's testimony, Kennedy told the Executive Council that the women were "not city people and their mentality as witnesses and generally must be considered in the light of their own history and environment". He went on to belittle generally a "Catholic bourgeoisie" of rural social climbers with "British leanings" and found it "humiliating to have to confess" that British officers associated easily with such "girls of this social stratum.... It seems clear that the McCarthys were of this type. Officers of the National Army have been in many cases the butt for people of this kind".

The highly-prejudiced social commentary left the Minister for Justice, Kevin O'Higgins, furious. His own father was a medical doctor from a similar background to McCarthy. He protested vehemently. He was isolated in his views about the issue and twice threatened to leave the government.

O'Higgins had already spoken to Mulcahy in March 1923 about O'Daly's involvement in the Ballyseedy incident and others in Kerry. The Garda Síochána and two Dublin Guard officers (one who knew O'Higgins personally) stated that O'Daly was instrumental in the brutal murders of Rwpublican prisoners. Mulcahy was equally nonplussed then.

W.T. Cosgrave later wrote to McCarthy to suggest that he had the option of trying to prosecute the three officers through the civilian courts.

Developments
In the Dail Eireann one year later, the Labour Party leader Tom Johnson quoted different details from the newspaper Éire, which stated that Mulcahy had been directed to arrest "some" of the "four" officers and that a court-martial met, but as witnesses had been dispersed quickly around, the country the case had collapsed. He asked for a statement about the dispersion of witnesses and about what had been done for the abused women and asked why the Executive Council had refused to publish the results of the army investigation.

Cosgrave replied that the advice of the Attorney-General to the Executive Council had been acted upon and that it would not be published.

The Kenmare incident was a precursor to the Army Mutiny of 1924, which was the culmination of tension caused by a number of events and ideological divisions between civilian and military influences in authority, including the diminishing involvement of the IRB, of which Mulcahy and O'Daly were leading members, in a civilian-controlled army. Amongst many other resignations, sackings and demobilisations as part of the downsizing of the army, O'Daly resigned his post in 1924 and the Kenmare incident remained a historical curiosity until papers were released in the 1980s. He returned to the Army as a captain in construction in 1940.

References

County Kerry
Irish Army